12 Rods (also known by the stylistic variants 12RODS and Twelve Rods) is an indie rock band from Minneapolis Minnesota. The group was formed in Oxford, Ohio in 1992, later relocating to Minneapolis in 1995 where it was based until its disbandment in 2004. 

Aside from a one-off reunion show in 2015, the band remained inactive until 2021, when frontman Ryan Olcott announced on Facebook that he was making a new album under the 12 Rods name.

History

1992: Formation
An early incarnation of the group that would become 12 Rods was formed in Oxford, Ohio in May 1992, initiated by Talawanda High School student Ryan Olcott. Friends and fellow students Christopher McGuire, Matt Flynn, and Daniel Perlin were included as members of the band. At this time, the group was known as Ryan'z Bihg Hed, a name coined by Flynn in reference to Olcott's purported behavior during their rehearsals. The band prepared numerous songs for a performance early in the summer of 1992 at a local high school graduation party named "Field Fest 3". A cassette recording of this performance, titled Helikopter Hundrid Dolurz, became their first release before the group disbanded until July 1992 when Olcott was invited to join a new group formed by McGuire, Flynn, and Daniel Burton-Rose at a performance at the end of the summer. Olcott accepted and the roster went on to name themselves "12RODS", a title discovered by Flynn in a passage from a children's Bible.

1993–1995: Career beginnings and relocation
The group independently released Bliss in 1993, their first album under the name 12 Rods, which was recorded in Minneapolis while the members were still living in Oxford. In 1996, one year after fully relocating to Minneapolis, the band released the EP gay?, which went on to bring the group much-needed publicity following a review by an early Pitchfork where it received one of the few 10.0 ratings given in the publication's history. Former Pitchfork columnist Jason Josephes spoke of gay? favorably in his "Three Blocks from Groove Street" column after he and Pitchfork founder Ryan Schreiber saw 12 Rods' first Minneapolis concert and bought the EP.

1996–2000: V2 Records era
In 1996, 12 Rods became the first American act to sign to the newly founded V2 Records, then a part of Richard Branson's Virgin Group, where gay? was reissued, making it the group's first major label release. The band's next album Split Personalities was released in 1998 and was named in Pitchforks first list of the best albums of the 1990s (although it was absent in the second version). Minneapolis musician Bill Shaw joined the group around this time, serving as its bassist until the end of the band's career.

12 Rods released its next album, the Todd Rundgren-produced Separation Anxieties, in 2000. Band members say Rundgren didn't do much during recording:

The band was dropped by V2 Records following the album's release, which was a disappointment both critically and commercially. Local Minneapolis drummer Dave King went on to be the group's drummer for most of the remainder of its career after McGuire's departure following the recording sessions for Separation Anxieties.

2000–2004: Independent era and disbandment
Jake Hansen joined the band in the summer of 2002 as an additional guitarist, and in 2003 George Marich took on drumming duties due to King's touring conflicts with The Bad Plus. The group recorded and released one more album, 2002's self-released Lost Time, then broke up in 2004.

2011–present: Lost Time reissue and first reunion, documentary, and second reunion
On September 7, 2011, it was announced on the website for Justin Vernon's record label Chigliak that 12 Rods had an album awaiting release in the label's "first year of vinyl releases", which began on May 22, 2012, with Amateur Love's It's All Aquatic, produced by Ev Olcott.

On October 8, 2014, 12 Rods announced via Facebook that Chigliak would be reissuing Lost Time on January 20, 2015, and the band would be playing a reunion show at First Avenue in Minneapolis on January 16, 2015 with Ryan Olcott, Ev, Christopher McGuire, Matthew Foust, Matt Flynn, Tal Tahir, Bill Shaw, Dave King, and Jake Hanson.

James Francis Flynn filmed the reunion show as part of a documentary about 12 Rods. Throughout the summer and fall of 2015 he completed gathering the interviews and additional footage for the documentary titled "Accidents Waiting to Happen". The film, modeled after Martin Scorsese's "The Last Waltz", was funded by a Kickstarter campaign and was shown at the Minneapolis Saint Paul International Film Festival in April 2017.

In September 2021, Ryan Olcott announced via the band’s Facebook page that he was making a new 12 Rods record with “zero help, zero support and zero financing”.

After 12 Rods
Following the band's first break-up, Ryan went on to perform solo as Foodteam (and later as ), with a band as Mystery Palace, and is a record producer in Minneapolis. Ev went on to play in Halloween, Alaska and The Few Nice Words, and co-founded audio software company Audiofile Engineering. McGuire went on to play with Kid Dakota, John Vanderslice, The Mountain Goats, Quruli and has been involved in giving drumming lessons. Matt Flynn currently lives in Cincinnati, Ohio and performs in a group called the Queen City Silver Stars and The Matt Flynn Jazz Trio where he plays the upright bass.  Bill Shaw re-formed Post Mortem Grinner and also plays in The Few Nice Words and Halloween, Alaska. Dave King plays actively with Happy Apple, The Bad Plus, Halloween, Alaska, and Dave King Trucking Company.

Discography
 Helikopter Hundrid Dolurz (1992 – as Ryan'z Bihg Hed)
 Bliss (1993)
 Gay? (1996)
 Split Personalities (1998)
 Separation Anxieties (2000)
 Lost Time (2002)
 Gay? remixed and remastered (2003)
 Unreleased Vol. 1-6 (2004)
 Last Show: First Avenue (2004)
 Reunion Show: First Avenue (2015)

Members
Ryan Olcott – vocals, guitar, synths
Ev (Olcott) – synths, guitar, vocals
Christopher McGuire – drums (1992–1999)
Matt Flynn – bass (1992–1994)
Matthew Foust – bass (1994–1996)
Bill Shaw – bass (1998–2004)
Dave King – drums (2000–2004)

Live/touring personnel
Tal Tahir – bass (1997)
Alejandro Urzagaste – bass (1998)
Jake Hansen – guitar (2002–2004)
George Marich – drums (2003–2004)

References
Pitchfork 
[ 12 Rods.] Allmusic.

Notes

External links
12 Rods official site
Citypages Interview (2004)

Musical groups from Minnesota
Rock music groups from Minnesota
Musical groups from the Twin Cities
V2 Records artists
Butler County, Ohio
Musical groups from Ohio
Rock music groups from Ohio
Musical groups established in 1992
Musical groups established in the 1990s
Musical groups disestablished in 2004
Musical quintets
Musical quartets
American musical trios